June Edmonds (born 1959) is an American painter, teaching artist, and public artist. Edmonds' work is notable for its colorful, layered surfaces that draw on meditative practices to explore the relationships between color, repetition, spiritual contemplation, the power of archetypical systems,  and interpersonal connection. She is an active and prominent contributor to the California, particularly Los Angeles area, art scene, and is a member of both the Artist's Alliance of Southern California and the Women's Caucus for Art. Her work has been shown extensively in California at venues including the California African American Museum, Huntington Beach Art Center, Watts Towers Art Center, and the Korean Cultural Center. Public art works by the artist include a Venetian glass mosaic at the MTA Pacific Station in Long Beach and a mural project titled "Windows to Health" with LA Commons/Building Healthy Communities at the Expo Center in Exposition Park. In 2018 Edmonds was a recipient of the City of Los Angeles (COLA) artist fellowship.

Early life and education 
June Edmonds was born and raised in Los Angeles. She received a B.A. in art at San Diego State University and a M.F.A. in painting at Tyler School of Art in Philadelphia. In 2022, Edmonds was awarded a Guggenheim Fellowship.

References 

1959 births
21st-century American painters
Artists from Los Angeles
Painters from California
San Diego State University alumni
Living people